Stephen Dunne or Steve Dunne may refer to:
Stephen Dunne (actor) (1918–1977), American actor, radio personality, and disc jockey; sometimes credited as Steve Dunne
Stephen Dunne (politician) (born 1988/89), Northern Irish politician
Steve Dunne (cricket umpire) (born 1943), New Zealand cricket umpire

See also
Stephen Dunn (disambiguation)